Thomas P. Amodeo (born 1951) is a lawyer and the current Chief Judge of Buffalo City Court, a position he has held since 1994.

Biography
Thomas P. Amodeo went to Canisius College for undergraduate studies, graduating in 1973. He attended Gonzaga University School of Law, obtaining his Juris Doctor in 1976.

From 1979 to 1985, he was a partner at "Amodeo & Gucciardo." In 1981, he became the General Counsel of the New York State Senate and served until 1985. During this time, he was also the attorney for Buffalo Urban Renewal (1984-1985). 1985 to 1990, until his appointment by the mayor of Buffalo to the Buffalo City Court, he was the "Assistant Corporation Counsel" for the City of Buffalo.

In 1990, he was appointed by then mayor James D. Griffin to the Buffalo City Court. In 1994, under Anthony Masiello, he became the Chief Judge of Buffalo City Court. In addition to Chief Judge duties, Amodeo is also the "Supervising Judge of City Courts" for the 8th Judicial District of New York, which includes Allegany, Cattaraugus, Chautauqua, Erie, Genesee, Niagara, Orleans & Wyoming Counties.

In 2014, Amodeo was rated "Outstanding," by the Erie County Bar Association, its highest rating.

Judicial experience
Acting Judge, Erie County Court, Appointed, 2003 to Present
Chief Judge, Buffalo City Court, Elected, 1995 to 2014
Chief Judge, Buffalo City Court, Appointed by Mayoral Appt., 1994 to 1995
Judge, Buffalo City Court, Elected, 1991 to 1994
Judge, Buffalo City Court, Appointed by Mayoral Appt., 1990 to 1991

Professional civic activities, honors, and awards
Member, N.Y. S Assoc. of City Court Judges, 1990–present
Director, Member, N.Y.S. Assoc. Drug Treat Ct. Professionals, 1999–present
Member, National Assoc. Drug Ct. Professionals, 1996–present
Chair, Criminal Law Adv. Bd., Erie Community College, 1994–present
Member, The Justinian Society, 1981–present
Member, Advocates Club, 2004–present
Director, Past President, North Buffalo Community Center, 1978–present
Director, Coach, Hertel North Park Youth Baseball, 1984–present
Co-Founder, Director, North Buffalo Youth Hockey, 1990 - 1998
Co-Founder, Former Director, North Buffalo Boosters, 1976 - 1990
Member, Former Director, Forest District Civic Association, 1990–present
Co-Founder, Former Director, Buffalo Italian Festival, 1989–present

See also
 Politics and Government of Buffalo, New York

References

Canisius College alumni
Benjamin N. Cardozo School of Law alumni
New York (state) Democrats
Politicians from Buffalo, New York
Living people
1951 births
Lawyers from Buffalo, New York